The Toronto-Dominion Bank Beach to Beacon 10K is a  road running event that takes place along the coastline of Cape Elizabeth, Maine. It begins at Crescent Beach State Park and ends at the Portland Head Light in Fort Williams Park.

Starting out as mainly a local event, athletes from all over the U.S. and various parts of the world  now participate in the annual event, including some world-class distance runners, including Olympic Marathon Silver medalists Catherine Ndereba and Meb Keflezighi, as well as Chicago Marathon winner Robert Kipkoech Cheruiyot. It was founded by U.S. women's marathon runner Joan Benoit Samuelson, who in 1984, won the first ever women's Olympic marathon. 1998 was the first year that the event was held and over 3000 runners participated in the race. From 1998 to 2004, the event was sponsored by the local People's Heritage Bank.  Since 2005, the race has been organised and sponsored by Toronto, Ontario-based Toronto-Dominion Bank. The 2009 race event registration filled in just 1 hour 45 minutes.

The race is managed by DMSE, Inc. whose president, Dave McGillivray, directs the Boston Marathon and more than 30 other races each year.

A then-record 5,668 runners participated in the event in 2010, which saw Lineth Chepkurui improve the women's course record by almost half a minute. This number was again improved in 2011, as 5,876 runners were at the starting line. Three-time winner Gilbert Okari is the men's record holder with his time of 27:27.5 from 2003.

The 2020 edition of the race was cancelled due to the coronavirus pandemic, with all registrants automatically receiving full refunds and the option to register early for the 2021 edition.

Past winners

Key:

Notes

References

External links
Beach to Beacon 10 km. Association of Road Racing Statisticians (2012-08-16). Retrieved on 2012-08-22.
Beach to Beacon official website 
Cool Running.com 

Sports in Maine
10K runs in the United States
Cape Elizabeth, Maine
Recurring sporting events established in 1998
1998 establishments in Maine